The Salado River ("Salty River") is a river that crosses several provinces of Argentina, flowing  from its source in the Salta Province to end in the Paraná River, in the Santa Fe Province. Because its origin, its flow varies widely within the year, and it can dry out in some parts of its path during the winter. The only important tributary to the river is the Horcones River, which is born in Salta as Cajón River, and joins the Salado in the Santiago del Estero Province.

Higher Salado
The Cabra Corral Dam regulates its flow, and deviates some of it for irrigation.

When the river enters the Gran Chaco plains it forms several arms  in a broad riverbed only partially occupied.

Santiago del Estero
The river then enters the Santiago del Estero Province from the north, near the border with the Tucumán Province, receiving the name of Salado. The Salado and the Dulce River ("Sweet River") south to it, run diagonally in direction south-east, and are the most important rivers to cross the arid lands of Santiago del Estero, being the economic and demographic axis of the province.

Further downstream, the river forms wide marsh wetlands and areas flooded seasonally, during the summer's major high waters. Downstream of the Añatuya marshlands the streamflow is greatly reduced, rendering the river dry most of the year.

Lower Salado
After a course of  inside Santiago del Estero, the river reaches the Santa Fe Province as Salado del Norte ("Northern Salty") to finally join the Paraná River in that province, being the last important tributary to the Paraná.

The more abundant rainfall in Santa Fe Province causes the Salado's discharge to increase. During rainy summers, the river can overflow its riverbed producing floods. A 2003 flood severely affected the city of Santa Fe.

The Salado debouches into the Paraná River southeast of Santa Fe City, in a flooding area with lagoons.

Other Argentine rivers called Salado
There are other, less important Salado rivers in Argentina, the most important of them being:
In Mendoza Province, San Luis Province and La Pampa Province, the Desaguadero-Salado runs down to the Colorado River.
In Catamarca Province and La Rioja Province, the local Colorado river is also referred to as Salado River (La Rioja).

See also
 List of rivers of Argentina

References

External links
Salado River at Monografias.com (Spanish)
Rio Salado: INTA's Planification (Spanish)

Rivers of Argentina
Rivers of Salta Province
Rivers of Santiago del Estero Province
Rivers of Santa Fe Province
Tributaries of the Paraná River